Allan Gordon Bell,  (born 24 May 1953) is a Canadian contemporary classical composer.

Career
Born in Calgary, Alberta, Bell received a Master of Music degree from the University of Alberta where he studied with Violet Archer, Malcolm Forsyth, and Manus Sasonkin, after completing undergraduate studies in philosophy. He also did advanced studies in composition at the Banff Centre for the Arts where his teachers were Jean Coulthard, Bruce Mather, and Oskar Morawetz. He has created works for solo instruments, chamber ensembles, orchestra, band, and electroacoustic media.

Bell is an Associate Composer of the Canadian Music Centre, for which he served as President of the National Board from 1984 to 1988. From 1978 to 1980, and from 1985 to the present, he has been a professor of composition and music theory at the University of Calgary, where he helped to create the Department of Music's doctoral programme.
He served on the jury of the 2002 SOCAN Awards for Young Composers and was a composer-in-residence at the 2001 Cantai Festival in Taiwan.

In the works of Bell one can hear the influences of prairie cultures and scenes and the sounds of nature, which he illustrates with orchestration. In 2004 he received a transplant that halted a serious liver condition; today he actively works in academia and continues to compose.

Recognition
In 2012, for his contribution to Canadian contemporary classical music and culture, Bell was made a Member of the Order of Canada. Previously, The Association of Canadian Choral Conductors had presented him with an award for outstanding choral compositions (in 1994 and again in 1999). He has also been the recipient of numerous teaching excellence awards.

In 2014, Bell received a Juno Award for his Field Notes in the Classical Composition of the Year category.

Music
Bell's works have been performed by the National Arts Centre Orchestra, Calgary Philharmonic Orchestra, Esprit Orchestra, the Vancouver Symphony Orchestra, the Manitoba Chamber Orchestra, the Edmonton Symphony Orchestra the Orford String Quartet, the Purcell String Quartet, the ensembles of Toronto New Music Concerts, Arraymusic and the Société de musique contemporaine du Québec, and many other professional and amateur organizations in Canada, the United States, the United Kingdom, West Germany, Israel, and Japan.

Highlights of performance of Bell's compositions include:
1988 - Concerto for Two Orchestras performed at the Olympic Arts Festival
1989 - Arche II was performed by the finalists at the Banff International String Quartet Competition and was sent by the CBC as the English Network submission to the International Rostrum of Composers in Paris
1992 - An Elemental Lyric was performed at Carnegie Hall in New York, the Kennedy Centre in Washington, D.C., and Symphony Hall in Boston
1996 - Danse sauvage was the imposed piece for the 1996 Honens International Piano Competition
2001 - Turtle Wakes (chamber opera) premiered by Calgary Opera

Works
Pas de quatre for percussion ensemble, 1976
Beltine for Violin, 1977
Nocturne for soprano and piano, 1977
Prelude and Passacaglia for piano, 1977
Ark for string quartet, 1980
Encounters for two violins and two cellos, 1980
Five Rituals for flute, oboe, clarinet, horn, bassoon and two drums, 1980
Morning Music: A Reflection upon Stillness for Violin and Piano, 1980
Dynamus for string orchestra, 1980
Kinesis for speaker, two pianos and two percussion, 1981
Drawing down the Moon for string orchestra, 1982
Mistaya for two drums, 1982
Monashee: Three Lyric Sketches for Cello and Piano, 1982
From Chaos to the Birth of a Dancing Star Band, 1983
Concerto for Percussion and Orchestra, 1984
The Gift of the Wolf, music theater for narrator, children's ensemble, violin, cello and piano, 1984
Gaia for flute, oboe, clarinet, four cellos, piano and two percussion, 1984
The Ugly Duckling, musical theater for female voice, flute, violin and piano, 1985
In the Eye of the Four Winds Concert Band, 1986
At Enchantment for Cello and Piano, 1986
Prairie for synthesizers and computers, 1986
Innua: Three Masks for Violin, Cello and Piano, 1987
The Ascendant Voice for wind ensemble, 1988
Concerto for Two Orchestras, 1988
Prairie II for synthesizers, digital samplers and computers, 1988
Sonora Borealis for piano, 1989
Vision Quest for band, 1989
Ark II for String Quartet, 1989
Orca for nine players, 1989
Lumen: A Quintet for Two Violins, Two Violas and Cello, 1990
Moon of Flowers for synthesizers, digital samplers and computers, 1990
A Prairie Requiem for clarinet, harp and marimba, 1991
At Elemental Lyric , 1992
Old Coyote's Saturday Night for piano, 1992
Snow - More Snow - Snow for bass clarinet, cello and marimba, 1993
Grassi Lakes Four Seasons for children's choir and piano, 1993
Aurages: Seven Ephemera for Flute, Violin, Viola, Cello and Double Bass, 1994
Spirit Trail, 1994
Ark III for violin, percussion and string orchestra, 1994
Shadows, Echoes, impressions for digital samplers and computers, 1994
Animus for alto saxophone, percussion and string orchestra, 1995
Nebulae for piano, 1995
Danse sauvage for piano, 1996
Sweetgrass for flute, clarinet, violin, cello, piano and percussion, 1997
Chthonic Canons for three tubas, 1998
Sundogs Reel for string orchestra, 1998
Turtle Wakes - An Opera , 1998
Two Roads to the Heartland for Children's Choir and Piano, 1998
Chiaroscuro, 1999
a great arch softening the mountains for voice, bass clarinet, violin, piano and Axio / soundfiles, 2001
Symphonies of Hidden Fire , 2002
Serenity for small orchestra, 2004
Trails of Gravity and Grace for clarinet, cello and piano, 2003
Festival Fanfare for horn, two trumpets, trombone and tuba
music for Aesop's Fables (one-act play), 2013

References

External links
 Allan Gordon Bell's Canadian Music Centre Profile
 Allan Gordon Bell at The Living Composers Project
 Allan Gordon Bell's Lecture of a Lifetime at the University of Calgary, 2013

1953 births
Living people
21st-century classical composers
21st-century Canadian male musicians
Canadian classical composers
Canadian male classical composers
Juno Award for Classical Composition of the Year winners
Members of the Order of Canada
Musicians from Calgary
University of Alberta alumni
Academic staff of the University of Calgary